is a passenger railway station located in  Chūō-ku in the city of Sagamihara, Kanagawa Prefecture, Japan, and is operated by the East Japan Railway Company (JR East).

Lines

Station layout
Yabe Station is an elevated station with a single island platform serving two tracks. The station is attended, but its operation is consigned to East Japan Eco Access Co., Ltd.

Platforms

History 
Yabe Station originated as a temporary stop for personnel working on the freight operations associated with the United States Army Sagami Fuel Depot, whose trains used the Yokohama Line tracks. The stop was upgraded to a train station on 1 October 1957 on the Japan National Railway (JNR). The station building was rebuilt in October 1979. With the privatization of the JNR on 1 April 1987, the station came under the operational control of JR East.

Station numbering was introduced on 20 August 2016 with Yabe being assigned station number JH26.

Passenger statistics
In fiscal 2019, the station was used by an average of 12,378 passengers daily (boarding passengers only).

The passenger figures (boarding passengers only) for previous years are as shown below.

Surrounding area
Azabu University
Fuchinobe High School 
 U.S. Forces Japan Sagami General Depot

See also
List of railway stations in Japan

References

External links

Station information page 

Railway stations in Kanagawa Prefecture
Railway stations in Japan opened in 1957
Railway stations in Sagamihara
Yokohama Line